Tatyana Konstantinova (born November 8, 1970, in Pechersk, Kyiv) is a retired female hammer thrower from Russia. Her personal best throw was 72.09 metres, achieved on June 4, 1999, in Moscow.

Achievements

External links
 
 sports-reference

1970 births
Living people
Russian female hammer throwers
Athletes (track and field) at the 2000 Summer Olympics
Olympic athletes of Russia